Liberty Building may refer to:

in England
Liberty Buildings, the temporary name given to the Bluecoat Chambers, Liverpool by the then owner William Lever

in Morocco

in the United States
Liberty Building (Buffalo, New York), 1925 neo-classical 23-story building in Buffalo, New York
Liberty Building (Des Moines, Iowa), 1923 12-story highrise listed on the National Register of Historic Places (NRHP)
Liberty Building (Medford, Oregon), listed on the NRHP in Jackson County, Oregon

in Uruguay
Liberty Building (Montevideo), built in the 1970s, served as a working place of the President of Uruguay from the 1980s to early 2000s